This is a list of radio stations in Kingston, Jamaica. These are 16 radio stations in Kingston.

FM Stations

See also
Listen online radios of Jamaica
Lists of radio stations in Africa
Lists of radio stations in Asia
Lists of radio stations in Europe
Lists of radio stations in South America
Lists of radio stations in the South Pacific and Oceania

References

Jamaica